Francis Joseph Carty (3 April 1897 – 10 September 1942) was a leader of the Irish Republican Army (IRA) in the Irish War of Independence, and a long-serving Fianna Fáil Teachta Dála (TD).

Early life
He was born on 3 April 1897 in Clooncunny, County Sligo, the only son of John Carty and Ellen Carty (née Rice).

Prison escapes and attempts
Carty's first escape from confinement came on 26 June 1920, when he was rescued from Sligo Gaol.

On 15 February 1921, Carty next escaped from Derry Gaol. The rescue party was led by Charles McGuinness. Carty was taken from the city in a coal boat, the Carricklee by the first mate Oskar Norrby, a Swede.
 
Following recapture, Frank Carty was later involved in an incident in Glasgow, Scotland when on 4 May 1921, members of the IRA attempted to free him from a prison van in a failed escape attempt. One Inspector was killed by gunfire, and another was wounded. Following the incident, thirteen people were brought to trial, but were acquitted by the jury, which accepted their alibi.

Political career
Carty was first elected in the 1921 general election to the 2nd Dáil for the Sligo–Mayo East constituency, and was re-elected in eight successive general elections. In common with other TDs opposed to the Anglo-Irish Treaty, he did not take his seat in the 3rd Dáil or in the 4th Dáil, returning to Leinster House only as a founder member of Fianna Fáil, when he followed Éamon de Valera into the 5th Dáil, taking his seat on 12 August 1927.

He remained active in local politics, being a member of the Sligo County Council from 1928 to 1934 representing the Tubbercurry area.  He was re-elected in August 1942, only a month before his death, after which his Dáil seat remained vacant until the 1943 general election.

Self-educated, he was called to the bar in 1936. He married Kathleen McGowan in 1938; they had no children.

References

Sources
Younger, Carlton (1968). "Ireland's Civil War", 354.
Coyle, Stephen (2008). "High Noon on High Street: The Story of a Daring Ambush by the IRA in Glasgow in 1921". .
James, Lawrence. "Warrior Race: A History of the British at War", Macmillan (2003), 354, .

1897 births
1942 deaths
Fianna Fáil TDs
Irish Republican Army (1919–1922) members
Early Sinn Féin politicians
Members of the 2nd Dáil
Members of the 3rd Dáil
Members of the 4th Dáil
Members of the 5th Dáil
Members of the 6th Dáil
Members of the 7th Dáil
Members of the 8th Dáil
Members of the 9th Dáil
Members of the 10th Dáil
Politicians from County Sligo